Milomir Miljanić (born 14 June 1963), nicknamed Miljan (Миљан), is a Montenegrin folk singer. Initially a guslar (gusle player, bard), he was the 5-time national champion before turning to pop-music in 2005. He is known for his traditional folk songs, which are mainly on patriotic and love themes. His hits include Gledaj, Orle and Izbeglica.

Musical career

Epic poetry
Miljan began performing Serbian epic poetry on gusle as a young child. At 16 years of age, he released his first album. At 17, he won the Junior Championship in gusle, while as a senior, he won a total of five times.

In 1990 he released his gusle cassette "The Wings of Kosovo", which sold a record-breaking 300 copies a day.

His epic songs are mainly on the breakup of Yugoslavia.

Singing
In 2005 he left the epic poetry scene and entered the folk music scene with the release of his album Postadosmo dva naroda. He is known for his traditional folk songs, which are mainly on patriotic and love themes.

As of 2012, he has released more than 30 albums.

Personal life
Miljanić is a Serbian nationalist. He lives in Belgrade, where he also holds a production company (Astron). He is married, and has three children.

Discography
2005.	Постадосмо два народа	
2007.	Избеглица	
2008.	Да се не заборави
2010.	Идем тамо ђе ме воле
2011.	Бунтовник

References

Sources

1963 births
Living people
Musicians from Nikšić
20th-century Montenegrin male singers
Montenegrin folk singers
Serbs of Montenegro
21st-century Montenegrin male singers